Pepinster ( or ) is a municipality of Wallonia located in the province of Liège, Belgium.

On 1 January 2006 Pepinster had a total population of 9,560. The total area is 24.79 km2 which gives a population density of 386 inhabitants per km2. Pepinster is situated at the confluence of the rivers Hoëgne and Vesdre.

Pepinster was hit extremely hard by the 2021 European floods, the village was temporarily cut off from roads.

Image gallery

See also
 Fort de Tancrémont, a companion to Fort Eben-Emael, located just outside the town
 List of protected heritage sites in Pepinster

References

External links
 

 
Municipalities of Liège Province